Evarcha flagellaris is a jumping spider species in the genus Evarcha. It lives in Kenya and South Africa. The species was first described in 2011.

References

Salticidae
Fauna of Kenya
Spiders of Africa
Spiders of South Africa
Spiders described in 2011
Taxa named by Wanda Wesołowska